Countess Katinka Kendeffy de Malomvíz Andrássy (1830 – 16 May 1896) was a Hungarian noblewoman and  the wife of Count Gyula Andrássy, who served as Prime Minister of Hungary (1867–1871) and Minister of Foreign Affairs of Austria-Hungary (1871–1879).

Early life 
Kendeffy was born in Kolozsvár, Kingdom of Hungary, Austrian Empire  (now Cluj-Napoca, Romania) to Count Ádám Kendeffy de Malomvíz (1795-1834) and his wife, Countess Borbála "Bora" Bethlen de Bethlen (1800–1880).

Biography 
After the coronation of King Franz Joseph I, she became Hungarian marshalless and an intimate friend of Empress Elisabeth of Austria (Sisi). She died in 1896, six years after her husband.

Personal life 
She married Count Gyula Andrássy de Csíkszentkirály et Krasznahorka in Paris, on 9 July 1856, when Andrássy lived in emigration after defeat of the Hungarian Revolution of 1848. They had four children:
 Tivadar (1857–1905): politician, first husband of Countess Eleonóra Zichy de Zich et Vásonkeő (1867–1945)
 Ilona (1858–1952): wife of Count Lajos Batthyány de Németújvár (1860–1951) who served as Governor of Fiume
 Manó (?)
 Gyula (1860–1929): politician, second husband of Countess Eleonóra Zichy de Zich et Vásonkeő (1867–1945).

References

External links

 Count József Andrássy Gyula Foundation
 Iván Nagy: Magyarország családai czimerekkel és nemzedékrendi táblákkal. I-XIII. Bp., 1857–1868
 

1830 births
1896 deaths
Hungarian nobility
Katinka Kendeffy
Date of birth missing
Place of birth missing
People from Cluj-Napoca